Lynne Mary Jones (born 26 April 1951) is a British Labour Party politician, who was the Member of Parliament (MP) for Birmingham Selly Oak from 1992 until the dissolution of parliament in April 2010.

Early life
Jones was born in Birmingham, and attended the local Bartley Green Girls' Grammar School (now the comprehensive Hillcrest School) in Woodgate. She studied Biochemistry at the University of Birmingham, eventually gaining her Ph.D. in 1979. She also has a post-graduate Diploma in Housing Studies from Birmingham Polytechnic (now Birmingham City University). She worked in research at the University of Birmingham from 1972–86. She was a housing association manager from 1987–92. She joined the Labour Party in 1974.

She has worked in both science and housing, and was a Councillor on Birmingham City Council representing Kings Norton ward from 1980–94.

Research interests
She first studied stimulus-response coupling in the rat parotid gland and at alpha adrenergic receptors. This led to a discovery that there are cell-surface receptors that are stimulated by hormones and neurotransmitters controlled by changes of intracellular calcium ion levels. It also involves the conversion of inositol phospholipids in the cell membrane. She also worked on the process of agonist-stimulated incorporation of radioactive phosphate into inositol phospholipids.

Parliamentary career
Jones was first elected to the House of Commons at the 1992 general election. She was a member of the Socialist Campaign Group and took part in almost all of the backbench rebellions against the Labour government. She was also Chair of the Parliamentary Forum on Transsexualism, and is a patron of Press for Change.

From 1993–2001 she was on the Science and Technology Select Committee. During the 2005–10 parliament she was a member of the Environment, Food and Rural Affairs Select Committee.

Leadership challenge
In February 2006, she announced her intention to stand against then Chancellor Gordon Brown in the Labour Party leadership contest expected to follow Prime Minister Tony Blair's resignation if nobody else did, so that Brown could not simply be "crowned". Subsequently, Socialist Campaign Group Chair John McDonnell attempted to stand instead, but failed to gain enough nominations from MPs and Brown was unopposed.

Retirement
Following boundary changes in Birmingham, which reduced its parliamentary representation from eleven to ten seats, Jones was expected to apply for selection for the redrawn Selly Oak constituency which contained wards from the former Selly Oak and Hall Green constituencies. However, in January 2007 Jones announced her intention to stand down at the 2010 general election. Jones refused to endorse Roger Godsiff in Hall Green, instead supporting the Respect candidate Salma Yaqoob, who came second.

National Executive Committee
Jones is running to be on Labour's National Executive Committee, challenging former Welsh First Minister Carwyn Jones.

Personal life
She is married, and has two sons (including one born in January 1990). She married Chris Kirk in April 1994 in Lambeth. He is Chief Executive of the Biochemical Society. She is a keen cyclist.

In November 2009, she announced she was having treatment for breast cancer after a tumour was discovered at an early stage.

References

External links

 Lynne Jones MP official site
 ePolitix - Lynne Jones MP
 Open Rights Group - Lynne Jones MP
 Guardian Unlimited Politics - Lynne Jones MP
 TheyWorkForYou.com - Lynne Jones MP
 The Public Whip - Lynne Jones MP voting record
 BBC News - Lynne Jones BBC profile

News items

 Cancer diagnosis in November 2009
 Politics Show May 2006
 Kilroy Silk in January 2004
 Clare Short in May 2003
 Clare Short's future in April 2003
 Page 3 Girls in January 2003
 Housing policy in April 2002
 Budget in March 2001
 Pensions in May 2009

1951 births
Living people
Alumni of Birmingham City University
Alumni of the University of Birmingham
English biochemists
British republicans
European democratic socialists
Labour Party (UK) MPs for English constituencies
People from Birmingham, West Midlands
UK MPs 1992–1997
UK MPs 1997–2001
UK MPs 2001–2005
UK MPs 2005–2010
Female members of the Parliament of the United Kingdom for English constituencies
Councillors in Birmingham, West Midlands
Women biochemists
20th-century British women scientists
20th-century British women politicians
21st-century British women politicians
20th-century English women
20th-century English people
21st-century English women
21st-century English people
Women councillors in England